The 1948 Meistaradeildin was the sixth season of Meistaradeildin, the top tier of the Faroese football league system. B36 Tórshavn won its second championship.

Teams

A total of 6 teams participated in the league, facing each other once. Previous season's champions SÍ Sørvágur did not participate in the league. The same applied for SÍF Sandavágur and MB Miðvágur, who participated in the previous season. B36 and HB fielded two teams each, their first and their reserve team. KÍ from Klaksvík and VB from Vágur where the other two teams.

League table

Results

References

External links
Faroe Islands Premier League at Faroe Soccer (choose 1948)
Faroe Islands League Final Tables by webalice.it
Faroese champions by RSSSF

Meistaradeildin seasons
Faroe
Faroe